Hanselmann is a German surname. Notable people with the surname include:

Élizabeth Teissier (née Germaine Élizabeth Hanselmann, born 1938), French astrologer and former model and actress
Knut Hanselmann (born 1946), Norwegian politician
Rony Hanselmann (born 1991), Liechtenstein footballer
Simon Hanselmann (born 1981), Australian cartoonist
Simone Hanselmann (born 1979), German actress
Thomas Hanselmann (born 1976), Liechtenstein footballer

See also
Hanselman

German-language surnames